KFF Teuta is an Albanian women's football club based in Durrës. They compete in the Albanian Women's National Championship.

References 

Football clubs in Albania
Teuta
Teuta women